Pental Island is an island and rural locality in Victoria, Australia, bordering Swan Hill, Victoria in the north. The island is bounded by the Murray River in the north and the Little Murray River in the south; the Little Murray diverging from the Murray at Fish Point and converging at Swan Hill. Pental Island is also a parish of the County of Tatchera and the boundaries of the three entities are identical. The indigenous Wemba Wemba name for the island is Pakaruk.

Two bridges allow access to the island from within Victoria, on Pental Island Road at Swan Hill in the west, and on Fish Point Road at Fish Point in the east. There are no crossings to the island over the Murray from New South Wales.

Boundary dispute
Pental Island is one of two areas (the other is Beveridge Island) which were the subject of border disputes between the states of Victoria and New South Wales. When the Murray was opened for navigation the question arose as to whether all navigable channels were part of New South Wales, as claimed by that state, or whether the Little Murray River was a continuation of the Loddon River enclosing Pental Island as claimed by Victoria. The dispute was raised in 1871 and was resolved in favour of Victoria by the Judicial Committee, with no  detailed reasons given.

References

External links
County of Tatchera,  Cadastral map showing county and parish boundaries, categories of lands holdings and reserves., 1880s. National Library of Australia

Towns in Victoria (Australia)
Rural City of Swan Hill
Islands of Victoria (Australia)
Murray River
Territorial disputes of Australia
Borders of Victoria (Australia)
Borders of New South Wales
River islands of Australia